The Senate Economic Mobility Caucus is a bipartisan organization within the United States Congress that explores the facts and drivers of economic mobility and provides a forum for dialogue on mobility-enhancing policy solutions. The caucus co-chairs for the 114th Congress are U.S. Senators Jerry Moran (R-KS) and Sherrod Brown (D-OH).

Aim

The Economic Mobility Caucus aims to provide “a fact-based framework and serve as a clearinghouse for ideas and information…to assess government policies and identify areas of agreement among the Members of Congress.”

History and Membership

The Economic Mobility Caucus was established in July 2012 by U.S. Senators Jerry Moran (R-KS) and Ron Wyden (D-OR). Senator Sherrod Brown (D-OH) joined the group in 2013.

Caucus Leadership 
 112th Congress: U.S. Senator Jerry Moran (R-KS), U.S. Senator Ron Wyden (D-OR)
 113th Congress: U.S. Senator Jerry Moran (R-KS), U.S. Senator Ron Wyden (D-OR)
 114th Congress: U.S. Senator Jerry Moran (R-KS), U.S. Senator Sherrod Brown (D-OH)

See also
Congressional caucus

References

United States Senate
Caucuses of the United States Congress